is Japanese yakuza film series directed by Junya Sato.

Soshiki Bōryoku

 Tetsuro Tamba as Detective Uragami
 Sonny Chiba as Takasugi Shinji
 Ryūnosuke Tsukigata as Otaguro Shodo
 Fumio Watanabe as Imanishi
 Ryōhei Uchida as Teramachi
 Nobuo Yana
 Hideo Murota as Detective Horiike
 Hisashi Igawa as Detective Ashida
 Nenji Kobayashi as Chorokichi
 Tatsuo Matsumura as Kuribayashi
 Kōji Tsuruta (Special appearance)

Zoku Soshiki Bōryoku

Tetsurō Tamba as Detective Kitagawa
Fumio Watanabe as Hōdō Gorō
Kyōsuke Machida as Ishigami
Ryōhei Uchida as Sakaki Shinsaku
Hayato Tani as Sugii
Hideo Murota as sawai
Rinichi Yamamoto as Nakanishi
Nobuo Yana as Shiraki
Kenji Imai as Nakagawa
Shigeru Tsuyuguchi as Tazawa
Noboru Ando as Kunisaki Kenji

Soshiki Bōryoku Kyōdaisakazuki

Bunta Sugawara as Kijima Naojirō
Noboru Ando as Oba Kenji
Fumio Watanabe as Takegami Mansaku
Hitomi Nozoe as Nobuko
Kanjūrō Arashi as Daimon Shinsaku
Nobuo Yana as Tetsu
Shingo Yamashiro as Tokuzo
Kei Taguchi as Irie
Hiroshi Miyauchi 
Nenji Kobayashi
Kyōsuke Machida as Tsugaya
Tetsurō Tamba as Wajima Taichirō

References

Japanese film series
Films directed by Junya Satō
1960s Japanese films